Diatribe Records is an independent record label based in Dublin, Ireland.

Artists
Artists and composers released on the label include Gilad Atzmon, Gerald Barry, Ed Bennett, John Buckley, Elliott Carter, Ben Davis, Donnacha Dennehy, Kit Downes, Roger Doyle, Colin Dunne, Benjamin Dwyer, Róisín Elsafty, Julie Feeney, Zohar Fresco, Mamoru Fujieda, Ronan Guilfoyle, Izumi Kimura, Stefano Landi, Cora Venus Lunny, Tarquinio Merula, Akira Miyoshi, Claudio Monteverdi, Mike Nielsen, Iarla Ó Lionáird, Caoimhín Ó Raghallaigh, Nick Roth, Matthew Schellhorn, Laura Sheeran, Duke Special, Barbara Strozzi, Thought-Fox, Francesco Turrisi, Niall Vallely, Ian Wilson, Takashi Yoshimatsu, Yurodny, and John Zorn.

History 
The company was founded in the late 1990s by Daniel Jacobson and John Cosgrove, with the aim to release and promote the work of local underground artists. The label began releasing electronic releases sporadically, mainly on vinyl. After a period of inactivity, Diatribe Recordings was re-launched in 2007 and releases became more frequent with the label focusing on a broader musical vision. From 2008, the label has been under the direction of Nick Roth and Matthew Jacobson.

According to label director Nick Roth:
"The main reason for the existence of our label is not as a commercial enterprise but as a way of furthering and promoting the music".

The label has produced 29 album releases to date, ranging across genres including jazz, electronica, classical and contemporary music.

In 2009 the label then released a series of projects focusing on individual musicians called the Solo Series Phase I.
The set constituted a conspectus of new music from three continents. Diatribe revisited this concept again in 2014, releasing another four projects under the Solo Series Phase II,“which features some of the country's most exciting and ground-breaking musicians making music today: Caoimhín Ó Raghallaigh (Hardanger d’Amore); Kate Ellis (cello); Adrian Hart (violin) and Cora Venus Lunny (violin, viola).”
 
The label released a solo record by fiddler Caoimhín Ó Raghallaigh, with one reviewer stating that Ó Raghallaigh's Music For An Elliptical Orbit, "contains some of the most beautiful and visceral musical compositions to have graced this earth".

Releases

References

External links 
 

Irish independent record labels

Irish record labels